149th Street may refer to the following New York City Subway stations in the Bronx:

 149th Street (Manhattan)
Third Avenue–149th Street (IRT White Plains Road Line), serving the  trains
East 149th Street (IRT Pelham Line), serving the  train
149th Street–Grand Concourse (New York City Subway), a station complex consisting of:
149th Street – Grand Concourse (IRT Jerome Avenue Line), serving the  train
149th Street – Grand Concourse (IRT White Plains Road Line), serving the  trains
149th Street (IRT Third Avenue Line), a defunct aboveground station, closed 1973